O. spinosa may refer to:
 Ochrotrichia spinosa, a microcaddisfly species in the genus Ochrotrichia
 Octonoba spinosa, a non-venomous spider species in the genus Octonoba
 Oncoba spinosa, a flowering plant species
 Onigocia spinosa, a fish species in the genus Onigocia
 Ononis spinosa, a medicinal plant species
 Ophellantha spinosa, a plant species in the genus Ophellantha
 Opopaea spinosa, a spider species in the genus Opopaea and the family Oonopidae
 Ovalia spinosa, a harvestman species in the genus Ovalia

See also
 Spinosa (disambiguation)